Burial of Fatima is about the secret burial and the uncertainty in the resting place of Fatima, daughter of the Islamic prophet Muhammad, and wife of Ali, the fourth caliph after Muhammad and the first Shia Imam. Fatima died in 11 AH (632 CE), within six months of Muhammad's death, allegedly from her injuries during a raid on her house ordered by the first caliph, Abu Bakr. Following her will, she was buried secretly at night. Her exact burial place in Medina remains uncertain, though two possible locations are the al-Baqi' cemetery and her home. In Shia sources, Fatima's wish for a secret burial is viewed as a sign of the disassociation of Muhammad's daughter with the Muslim community who largely failed to support her against Abu Bakr.

Background 

After Muhammad died in 11/632, Fatima and her husband Ali refused to acknowledge the authority of the first caliph, Abu Bakr. The couple and their supporters held that Ali was the rightful successor of Muhammad, referring to his announcement at Ghadir Khumm.

Fatima died in Medina in the same year, within six months of Muhammad's death. She was 18 or 27 years old at that time according to Shia and Sunni sources, respectively. Shia Islam holds that Fatima's injuries during an alleged attack on her house directly caused her miscarriage and death shortly after. The alleged attack, intended to subdue Ali, is said to have been instigated by Abu Bakr and led by his aide Umar. 

The above allegations are categorically rejected by Sunnis. On the one hand, Shia historians list some early Sunni sources that corroborate these allegations, pointing out that sensitive information has been censored by Sunni scholars who were concerned with the righteous presentation of Muhammad's companions. On the other hand, it is unimaginable for Sunnis that Muhammad's companions would engage in violence against Muhammad's family. In turn, Sunni Islam holds that Fatima died from grief after Muhammad's death and that her child died in infancy of natural causes.

Secret burial 

Following her will, Ali buried Fatima secretly at night and hid her burial plot. As reported by al-Tabari, her dying wish was that Abu Bakr should not attend the funeral, and this request was fulfilled by Ali. Fatima's wish is believed to be at odds with the common practice of Muslims, who are encouraged to join funerals. In Shia sources, her wish for a secret burial is viewed as a sign of the disassociation of Muhammad's daughter with the Muslim community who largely failed to support her against Abu Bakr. Among contemporary authors, Madelung and Osman suggest that the secret burial was a clear message that Fatima died in a state of resentment against Abu Bakr. In preparation for her death, Klemm writes that Fatima had requested a closed bier.

The prominent Twelver traditionist al-Tusi reports an account of the burial attributed to their son Husayn. This account describes that Ali broke into tears as he completed the unmarked grave of his wife. He then turned to Muhammad's grave and said:

Al-Mufid, another notable Twelver scholar, includes in his Ikhtisas a related tradition ascribed to Ja'far al-Sadiq, the sixth Imam. This tradition describes that the next morning Abu Bakr and Umar berated Ali for the secret burial of Fatima. After learning that this was Fatima's wish, the account continues that Umar threatened to locate and exhume Fatima's body and then re-bury her after funeral prayer. According to this account, what prevented Umar from materializing his threat was Ali's warning, "By God, as long as I'm alive and [my sword] Zulfiqar is in my hands, you will not reach her, and you know best [not to do it]." For Khetia, the interpretation is that the loss of Fatima was so traumatizing for Ali that he threatened Umar with violence for the first time, despite his previous restraint.

Uncertain burial place

Fatima's exact burial place in Medina remains uncertain, with often contradictory reports. The two most probable locations for her grave are the al-Baqi' cemetery and her home, which was later annexed to the Prophet's Mosque. The former location is reportedly supported by her son Hasan's wish to be buried next to his mother. On the other hand, the Sunni al-Samhoodi concludes that Hasan is buried next to his grandmother Fatima bint Asad, rather than his mother Fatima. This uncertainty in Shia sources again underscores Fatima's displeasure with the Muslim community.

See also

References

Sources

Further reading 

 

 

 

Sunni Islam
Burials
Disputed tombs
Shia Islam
Fatimah